Carmelo Cassati  (6 April 1924 – 3 February 2017) was an Italian prelate of the Catholic Church.

Cassati was born in Tricase ordained a priest on 17 December 1949 from the religious order of the Missionaries of the Sacred Heart. In 1950, he was sent as a Missionary to Brazil and then, in 1951, to Peru. The Apostolic Nuncio of Peru, Giovanni Panico, appointed him his secretary.

Cassati was appointed auxiliary bishop of the Diocese of Pinheiro, as well as titular bishop of Nova Germania, on 27 April 1970 and ordained on 28 June 1970. Cassati was appointed bishop of Pinheiro diocese on 17 June 1975. Cassati resigned from the Titular see of Nova Germania in 1978, followed by an appointment to Diocese of Tricarico on 12 February 1979. Cassati was appointed bishop of the Diocese of Lucera and Diocese of San Severo on 7 September 1985, resigning from Lucera on 30 September 1986. Cassati's final appointment  was to the Archdiocese of Trani-Barletta-Bisceglie on 15 December 1990. Cassati remained with the diocese until his retirement on 13 November 1999. Cassati had lived in Eufemia-Tricase until his death at the age of 92.8 years.

External links
Catholic-Hierarchy
Trani-Barletta-Bisceglie Diocese 
Tricarico Diocese 
San Severo-Troia Diocese 
Lucera Diocese 

1924 births
2017 deaths
20th-century Roman Catholic bishops in Brazil
20th-century Italian Roman Catholic bishops
Roman Catholic archbishops in Italy
Bishops in Basilicata
Bishops in Apulia
Missionaries of the Sacred Heart
Roman Catholic bishops of Pinheiro
People from Tricase